ASCE Library is an online full-text civil engineering database providing the contents of peer-reviewed journals, proceedings, e-books, and standards published by the American Society of Civil Engineers. The Library offers free access to abstracts of Academic journal articles, proceedings papers, e-books, and standards as well as many e-book chapters.  Access to the content is available either by subscription or pay-per-view for individual articles or chapters. E-books and standards can be purchased and downloaded in their entirety.  Most references cited by journal articles and proceedings papers in the library are linked to original sources using CrossRef. Linking provides researchers with the ability to link from reference citations to the bibliographic records of other scientific and technical publishers’ articles.  ASCE also offers librarians usage statistics which are compliant with the COUNTER Code of Practice for Journals and Databases.  All articles are in PDF (Portable Document Format) and many journal articles are also available in HTML format.

History
ASCE Journals first appeared online in the Fall of 2000.  The online collection was designated ASCE Research Library in the Fall of 2004 with the addition of ASCE Proceedings papers.  In June 2012, the platform migrated from Scitation, to Literatum managed by Atypon and the site was renamed ASCE Library.  In June 2013, e-books and standards were added with the ability to download individual book chapters as well as complete books. In 2016, ASCE added access to premium content from Civil Engineering Magazine.

Coverage
The ASCE Library offers online access to more than 150,000 technical and professional papers.  It encompasses the full text of papers published in 35 journals (as of 2019) from 1983 to the present, conference proceedings from 2000 to the present, and full text of ASCE standards and e-books. The ASCE Library is supplemented by Civil Engineering Database (CEDB), a free bibliographic database offering records of all publications by American Society of Civil Engineers since 1872. CEDB is updated at the end of each month. The update includes the journal content for the following month and all other content published in the previous month.

Journals
Coverage includes the following Journals:

International Journal of Geomechanics
Journal of Architectural Engineering
Journal of Aerospace Engineering
Journal of Bridge Engineering
Journal of Composites for Construction
Journal of Performance of Constructed Facilities
Journal of Construction Engineering & Management
Journal of Computing in Civil Engineering
Journal of Cold Regions Engineering
Journal of Environmental Engineering
Journal of Engineering Mechanics
Journal of Energy Engineering
Journal of Geotechnical & Geoenvironmental Engineering
Journal of Hazardous, Toxic & Radioactive Waste
Journal of Hydrologic Engineering
Journal of Hydraulic Engineering
Journal of Irrigation & Drainage Engineering
Journal of Infrastructure Systems
Journal of Legal Affairs and Dispute Resolution in Engineering and Construction
Journal of Management in Engineering
Journal of Materials in Civil Engineering
Journal of Professional Issues in Engineering Education & Practice
Journal of Pipeline Systems Engineering and Practice
Journal of Structural Engineering
Journal of Surveying Engineering
Journal of Transportation Engineering, Part A: Systems
Journal of Transportation Engineering, Part B: Pavements
Journal of Urban Planning and Development
Journal of Water Resources Planning and Management
Journal of Waterway, Port, Coastal, and Ocean Engineering
Natural Hazards Review
Practice Periodical on Structural Design & Construction
ASCE-ASME Journal of Risk and Uncertainty in Engineering Systems, Part A: Civil Engineering; Part B: Mechanical Engineering

Proceedings
Includes more than 450 proceedings titles and 53,000 technical papers, as well as a complete archive of conference proceedings papers from 2000 to present (selected earlier conference proceedings are also included).

See also
List of academic databases and search engines

References

External links
American Society of Civil Engineers
ASCE Publication Homepage
ASCE Library web site
Journals
Proceedings
E-books
Standards
Special Collections from the ASCE Library

Civil engineering
American Society of Civil Engineers
Online databases